Nagaland Football Association (NFA) is one of the 37 Indian state football associations that are affiliated to the All India Football Federation. It is the state-level governing body of football in Nagaland, India. The Nagaland football team is also administered by NFA. Nagaland Football Association manages Nagaland Premier League, the state football competition in Nagaland.

Competitions
Nagaland Premier League is the top division of professional football league in the Indian state of Nagaland.
It features the best 10 teams of Nagaland competing for the trophy. Each club plays other twice (home and away).

At the end of each season the champion club will be nominated for I-League 2nd Division.

NFA also conducts Dr. Talimeren Ao Inter-District Championship among the districts of the state.

Affiliated clubs

References

Football governing bodies in India
Football in Nagaland